The Office for the Internal Market (OIM) is that part of the Competition and Markets Authority (a non-ministerial department) responsible for overseeing the UK internal market. Its objective is to monitor the UK internal market by reporting every year and every 5 years on the functioning of the internal market to the Parliament of the United Kingdom and devolved parliaments, and to conduct reviews and develop tools.

Any nation or business within the UK can seek information from the office regarding the UK internal market principles of non-discrimination and mutual recognition. The office can issue fines and it has been proposed that this should be £30,000 for single fixed penalties and £15,000 for a daily rate penalties.

History 
On 17 December 2020, the United Kingdom Internal Market Act 2020  received royal assent. Part 4 of the Act sets out arrangements for the creation the Office of the Internal Market within the Competition and Markets Authority.

On 22 March 2021, the Competition and Markets Authority appointed Rachel Merelie as the Senior Director for the OIM. On 21 September 2021, the Office for the Internal Market officially opened and began operating as the advisory body for the UK internal market.

Office for the Internal Market panel 
The office for the internal market panel that is responsible for overseeing the UK internal market. This panel consists of 7 members, including the panel chair, representatives of the devolved nations and independent members.

On September 1, 2021, the UK Office for the Internal Market began the process of filling the position for the OIM panel and this was due to finish on the October 3, 2021. On April 11, 2022, Business Secretary Kwasi Kwarteng appointed Murdoch MacLennan as the first chair of the panel.

Reports

Requests to the OIM 
On August 8, 2022, the UK Government asked the Office for the market to examine how a ban of peat in England would affect the UK internal market

See also 
 Devolution in the United Kingdom
 Northern Ireland Protocol
 Trade agreements of the United Kingdom
 United Kingdom common framework policies

References

External links 
 Guidance on the operation of the CMA's UK Internal Market functions
 Statement of Policy on the Enforcement of the OIM’s Information Gathering Powers

2021 establishments in the United Kingdom
Non-ministerial departments of the Government of the United Kingdom
Government bodies based in London